Timothy Shanahan may refer to:
Timothy Shanahan (philosopher) (born 1960), American philosopher
Timothy Shanahan (educator), American educator 
Timothy M. Shanahan, American geologist